Susan Miles was the pen name of Ursula Wyllie Roberts (1887–1975).

Biography
She was born at Meerut in India, where her father was in the British military. He was Lieutenant-Colonel Robert John Humphrey Wyllie and her mother was Emily Titcomb.

Under her own name, she wrote a pamphlet The Cause of Purity and Women's Suffrage which was published by the Church League for Women's Suffrage in 1912.

As Susan Miles, she published several slim volumes of poetry: Dunch (1918), Annotations (1922), Little Mirrors (1923?), The Hares (1924), News! News! (1943?), Rainbows (1962), A Morsel of Gold (1962) and Epigrams and Jingles (1962) as well as the more famous novel in verse Lettice Delmer (1958, reprinted by Persephone Books in 2002), two other novels (Blind Men Crossing a Bridge (1934) and Rabboni (1942)) and a biography of her husband, Rev. William Corbett Roberts, Portrait of a Parson (1955). Dunch was sufficiently significant to earn her a reasonably positive mention in Harold Monro's often unforgiving  Some Contemporary Poets (1920) and Herbert Palmer described her as "One [of] the most original" in the chapter on Women Poets in his 1938 study of post-Victorian poetry. She also edited Childhood in Verse and Prose (1923) and An Anthology of Youth in Verse and Prose (1925).

References

Further reading
 Lewis, B.W., "Susan Miles (Ursula Wyllie Roberts)" pp150–157 in Thesing W.B. (Ed), 2001. Dictionary of Literary Biography - Volume Two Hundred Forty - Late Nineteenth- and Early Twentieth-Century British Women Poets, Detroit: The Gale Group. This is an essay which outlines Susan Miles' life and work.

External links
 Author profile at Persephone Books
 Lettice Delmer at Persephone Books
 Susan Miles correspondence at Senate House Library, University of London

1887 births
1975 deaths
English women poets
20th-century English poets
20th-century English women writers
20th-century pseudonymous writers
Pseudonymous women writers
People from Meerut
British people in colonial India